Esperanza Márquez (born 10 July 1973) is a Spanish rower. She competed in the women's lightweight double sculls event at the 1996 Summer Olympics.

References

External links
 

1973 births
Living people
Spanish female rowers
Olympic rowers of Spain
Rowers at the 1996 Summer Olympics
Sportspeople from Seville